The Acoustical Society of America (ASA) is an international scientific society founded in 1929 dedicated to generating, disseminating and promoting the knowledge of acoustics and its practical applications. The Society is primarily a voluntary organization of about 7500 members and attracts the interest, commitment, and service of many professionals.

History
In the summer of 1928, Floyd R. Watson and Wallace Waterfall (1900–1974), a former doctoral student of Watson, were invited by UCLA's Vern Oliver Knudsen to an evening dinner at Knudsen's beach club in Santa Monica. The three physicists decided to form a society of acoustical engineers interested in architectural acoustics. In the early part of December 1928, Wallace Waterfall sent letters to sixteen people inquiring about the possibility of organizing such a society. Harvey Fletcher offered the use of the Bell Telephone Laboratories at 463 West Street in Manhattan as a meeting place for an organizational, initial meeting to be held on December 27, 1928. The meeting was attended by forty scientists and engineers who started the Acoustical Society of America (ASA). Temporary officers were elected: Harvey Fletcher as president, V. O. Knudsen as vice-president, Wallace Waterfall as secretary, and Charles Fuller Stoddard (1876–1958) as treasurer. A constitution and by-laws were drafted. The first issue of the Journal of the Acoustical Society of America was published in October 1929.

Technical committees
The Society has 13 technical committees that represent specialized interests in the field of acoustics. The committees organize technical sessions at conferences and are responsible for the representation of their sub-field in ASA publications. The committees include:
Acoustical oceanography
Animal bioacoustics
Architectural acoustics
Biomedical acoustics
Computational acoustics (Technical Specialty Group)
Acoustical engineering
Musical acoustics
Noise
Physical acoustics
Psychoacoustics
Signal processing in acoustics
Speech communication
Structural acoustics and vibration
Underwater acoustics

Publications
The Acoustical Society of America publishes a wide variety of material related to the knowledge and practical application of acoustics in physics, engineering, architecture, noise, oceanography, biology, speech and hearing, psychology and music.

 The Journal of the Acoustical Society of America (JASA) - founded in 1929, this is a peer-reviewed academic journal operating on the traditional subscription model.
 JASA Express Letters (2021-present) online archive- this is a peer-reviewed academic journal operating on the open access model.
 Proceedings of Meetings on Acoustics (POMA) (2007-present) online archive - repository for conference proceedings.
 Acoustics Today (2005-present) online archive a general interest magazine on acoustics.

In 2021, the ASA Publications' Office began producing Across Acoustics, a podcast to highlight authors' research from these four publications.

Discontinued publications 

Echoes (1991-2013) online archive - Quarterly newsletter.
 Acoustics Research Letters Online (2000-2005) online archive  - Launched as an open access journal. It became a section of the Journal of the Acoustical Society of America from 2006 to 2020, then in 2021 became the current journal JASA Express Letters.
 Noise Control (1955-1961) online archive
 Sound: Its Uses and Control (1962-1963) online archive - A continuation of Noise Control, with broadened scope.

Awards
The ASA presents awards and prizes to individuals for contributions to the field of Acoustics. These include:

 Gold Medal
 Silver Medal
 Interdisciplinary Silver Medal – Helmholtz-Rayleigh Interdisciplinary Silver Medal
 R. Bruce Lindsay Award
 Wallace Clement Sabine Medal
 Pioneers of Underwater Acoustics Medal
 A. B. Wood Medal and Prize of the Institute of Acoustics
 Trent-Crede Medal
 von Békésy Medal
 Honorary Fellows
 Distinguished Service Citation
Science Communication Award
Rossing Prize in Acoustics Education
David T. Blackstock Mentor Award
Medwin Prize in Acoustical Oceanography
William and Christine Hartmann Prize in Auditory Neuroscience

Most technical committees also sponsor awards for best student or early career presenter at each conference.

Student activity
The ASA offers membership and conference attendance to students at a substantially reduced rate. Conference attendance is further promoted by travel subsidies and formal and informal student meetings and social activities. The ASA also expanded services to students in 2004 by introducing regional student chapters.

References

External links
ASA Home Page
ASA students
 ASA Press Room
ASA Publications

 
Professional associations based in the United States
Acoustics